Khatiwada is a Purbiya Brahmin surname found in Nepal and Sikkim. Khatiwada is a toponymic family name from Khatyadi gaun(Khatyadi village) in Doti district. Notable people with the surname include:
 Ishwor Prasad Khatiwada, Judge of the Supreme Court of Nepal
N.B. Khatiwada, Veteran Sikkimese politician and Indian Supreme Court Lawyer
Yuba Raj Khatiwada, Veteran economist, Ambassador of Nepal to the US, former Finance Minister, former deputy head of Planning commission and former Governor of Nepal Rastra Bank
Shrinkhala Khatiwada, Miss Nepal World 2018 and Top 11 Miss World 2018

References

Nepali-language surnames
Khas surnames
Surnames of Nepalese origin